Rhizanthella speciosa is a species of flowering plant in the orchid family and is endemic to Barrington Tops in New South Wales. It is a mycoheterotrophic herb that spends its entire life cycle, including flowering, at or below the soil surface. As at September 2020, R. speciosa has not yet been accepted as a valid name by the World Checklist of Selected Plant Families or the Australian Plant Census.

Description
Rhizanthella speciosa is a leafless, sympodial herb with a horizontal rhizome and underground stem probably similar to that of R. slateri. After pollination, the flower produces a fleshy, narrow cylindrical drupe that is pinkish to light maroon when ripe.

Taxonomy and naming
This species of underground orchid was discovered in 2016 by scientific illustrator Maree Elliot and formally described in 2020 by Mark Clements and David Jones in the journal Lankesteriana from material collected in Barrington Tops National Park. The specific epithet speciosa is from the Latin  meaning "showy" or "splendid".

Distribution and habitat
Rhizanthella speciosa was found under dense leaf litter in tall wet sclerophyll forest of the Barrington Tops National Park with Sydney blue gum, tallowood, and turpentine, and a well-developed rainforest subcanopy with Trochocarpa laurina and Synoum glandulosum.

Conservation status
As of 2020, only fifty plants in a single locality are known. The habitat where it grows is widespread, but searches have not uncovered other populations. Thus the species meets the "critically endangered" definition. The population's exact location is kept unpublished for its protection.

References

speciosa
Myco-heterotrophic orchids
Orchids of New South Wales
Endemic orchids of Australia
Endangered flora of Australia
Plants described in 2020
Taxa named by Mark Alwin Clements
Taxa named by David L. Jones (botanist)